Sir William Urry (died 1673–1677) was Scottish Royalist officer during the Wars of the Three Kingdoms.

Biography
During the Interregnum Sir William joined Charles II in exile. He commanded Lord Newburgh's regiment of Scots at the Battle of the Dunes (1658). After the Restoration he was appointed colonel of the royal guards in Scotland.

Family
Sir William Urry married Jane Scott. Their son John Urry (1666, Dublin – 18 March 1715, Oxford) was a noted literary editor and medieval scholar.

Sir William's brother, Sir John Urry (or Hurry) (died 29 May 1650), was a professional Scottish soldier who changed sides several times during the Wars of the Three Kingdoms.

Notes

References

Further reading

VI.— Commission to Major William Urry, from the Earl of Essex to be Captain of a Troop of Horse {7 April 1643} (p. 158)
XVI.— Order of Precedence among the Officers of the Scottish Regiment {8 June 1657} (p. 165)
 XVII.—Commission to Col. William Urry to be Lieutenant-Colonel of the Scottish Regiment {1 November 1658} (p. 166)
 XIX.— Commission to Col. William Urry to be Captain of a Company of Foot in Scotland {12 February 1664} (pp. 167–168)
 XXIII.— Certificate of the Arms of Colonel William Urry {5 June 1673} (pp. 170–171)
 XXIII.— Petition of Jane Urry to Charles II {c. 1677} (p. 170–171)

1673 deaths
Year of birth unknown
Scottish military personnel